Luis Gustavo Santos Paulino (born February 11, 1991) is a Dominican professional baseball pitcher for the Saraperos de Saltillo of the Mexican League. He has played in Major League Baseball (MLB) for the Toronto Blue Jays.

Professional career

Pittsburgh Pirates
Santos signed with the Pittsburgh Pirates organization as an international free agent in 2011. Assigned to the Dominican Summer League Pirates, he pitched to a 2–1 win–loss record, 2.70 earned run average (ERA), and 23 strikeouts in 23 innings. In 2012, he played for both of Pittsburgh's DSL affiliates, and posted a combined 6–3 record, 2.44 ERA, and 74 strikeouts in 62 innings pitched.

Kansas City Royals
During the offseason, Santos was traded, along with Luis Rico, to the Kansas City Royals for Clint Robinson and Vin Mazzaro. He split the season between the Rookie-level Burlington Royals and the Rookie Advanced Idaho Falls Chukars. In total, Santos made 10 starts and went 7–1 with a 1.97 ERA and 47 strikeouts. Santos began the 2014 campaign with the Class-A Lexington Legends, and was promoted to the Advanced-A Wilmington Blue Rocks at mid-season. In 118 total innings, Santos pitched to an 8–5 win–loss record, 3.74 ERA, and 86 strikeouts. In the offseason, he pitched for the Toros del Este of the Dominican Winter League.

On April 2, 2015, Santos was released by the Royals.

Toronto Blue Jays
He signed a minor league contract with the Toronto Blue Jays on April 6 and was assigned to the Advanced-A Dunedin Blue Jays. He spent the entire season with Dunedin, going 6–6 with a 4.55 ERA and 86 strikeouts in 93 innings. Santos split the 2016 season with Dunedin and the Double-A New Hampshire Fisher Cats. In a career-high 127 innings pitched, he posted a 9–4 record, 3.97 ERA, and 117 strikeouts. Santos continued his progression through the Toronto minor league system, spending the majority of 2017 with the Triple-A Buffalo Bisons. He went 3–13 with a 4.16 ERA and 102 strikeouts in 114 innings.

On September 2, 2017, Santos was called up by the Blue Jays. He made his MLB debut that night, pitching 3 innings in Toronto's 7–2 win over the Baltimore Orioles. He was outrighted to Triple-A on November 6, 2017, and elected free agency the following day. On December 4, Santos signed a minor league contract with the Blue Jays that included an invitation to spring training.

Santos was recalled on May 3, 2018 for the second game of a doubleheader in Cleveland. He was designated for assignment the following day, and re-added to the active roster on July 4. Santos declared free agency on October 9, 2018.

Tampa Bay Rays
On December 19, 2018, Santos signed a minor league deal with the Tampa Bay Rays. He became a free agent following the 2019 season.

On February 4, 2020, Santos signed with the Guerreros de Oaxaca of the Mexican League. Santos did not play in a game in 2020 due to the cancellation of the Mexican League season because of the COVID-19 pandemic. On November 18, 2020, Santos was released by the Guerreros.

Saraperos de Saltillo
On May 5, 2021, Santos signed with the Saraperos de Saltillo of the Mexican League.

References

External links

1991 births
Living people
Buffalo Bisons (minor league) players
Burlington Royals players
Dominican Republic expatriate baseball players in Canada
Dominican Republic expatriate baseball players in Mexico
Dominican Republic expatriate baseball players in the United States
Dominican Summer League Pirates players
Dunedin Blue Jays players
Durham Bulls players
Idaho Falls Chukars players
Lexington Legends players
Major League Baseball pitchers
Major League Baseball players from the Dominican Republic
New Hampshire Fisher Cats players
People from Bonao
Saraperos de Saltillo players
Toronto Blue Jays players
Toros del Este players
Wilmington Blue Rocks players